Immortal Eyes is a series of tabletop role-playing game supplements published by White Wolf Publishing in 1995–1996 for their game Changeling: The Dreaming, consisting of The Toybox, Shadows on the Hill, and Court of All Kings.

Contents
Immortal Eyes: Shadows on the Hill is both a sourcebook on Hawaii and a continuation of the Immortal Eyes campaign.

Reception
Lucya Szachnowski reviewed Immortal Eyes: Shadows on the Hill for Arcane magazine, rating it a 7 out of 10 overall. Szachnowski comments that "Immortal Eyes: Shadows on the Hill is really only of passing interest for non-Changeling gamers, and the scenarios will only be of limited value to those who haven't got The Toybox. Nevertheless, it makes an excellent continuation of the Immortal Eyes campaign and is good value for money."

Reviews
Shadis #24 (February 1996) - Immortal Eyes: The Toybox

References

External links
Guide du Rôliste Galactique

Changeling: The Dreaming
Role-playing game books
Role-playing game supplements introduced in 1995